Empathy, Inc. is a 2018 American science fiction thriller film directed by Yedidya Gorsetman, written by Mark Leidner, and produced by Josh Itzkowitz, starring Zack Robidas, Kathy Searle, and Jay Klaitz. It premiered at Cinepocalypse on June 24, 2018, and was released theatrically on September 6, 2019.

Plot
The film tells the story of Joel, a struggling tech venture capitalist who invests his and his in-laws money in an extreme virtual reality company called Empathy Inc., whose proposed technology will allow wealthy people to spend time in the shoes of the less fortunate.

Cast
 Zack Robidas as Joel
 Kathy Searle as Jessica
 Jay Klaitz as Lester
 Eric Berryman as Nicolaus
 AJ Cedeno as Sonny
 Charmaine Reedy as Vicky
 Fenton Lawless as Ward
 Anthony Mangano as Officer Cortona
 Karen Lynn Gorney as Miss Miriam

Production
The film was written by Mark Leidner, directed by Yedidya Gorsetman, and produced by Josh Itzkowitz; the three previously worked together on the 2014 romantic comedy Jammed. It was shot over the course of six weeks in New York City in 2017.

Release
Empathy, Inc. premiered at Cinepocalypse on June 24, 2018. It went on to screen at Brooklyn Horror Film Festival, Austin Film Festival, Philadelphia Film Festival, and Panic Fest. In May 2019, it was announced that Dark Star Pictures had acquired North American rights to the film, and that it had been picked up by Oration Films for international distribution. It was released theatrically on September 6, 2019, followed by a VOD release on September 24, 2019.

Reception
On Metacritic, the film has a weighted average score of 48 out of 100, based on 4 critics, indicating "mixed or average reviews".

Alex McLevy in The A.V. Club wrote that the film "seethes with low-level menace and anxiety, and features a protagonist navigating a technological marvel that spins off the rails… it tells a solid story with verve and deft pacing." Richard Whittaker of The Austin Chronicle called it "an intricate and incisive dissection of greed, vicarious living, guilt, and the precariousness of the American middle class." Brian Tallerico of RogerEbert.com called the film's concept "brilliant". Dennis Harvey of Variety called it "a clever indie suspense that draws on fantasy-tinged notions of virtual reality and identity exchange to create an ingenious tale more in the realm of an intimately-scaled thriller than sci-fi."

References

External links 
 
 
 

2018 films
American science fiction thriller films
American black-and-white films
Films set in New York City
Films about virtual reality
2010s English-language films
2010s American films